The Ega is a river in the north of Spain. It is a tributary of the Ebro. The Ega flows through Navarre, but it originates in Álava, near Lagrán, and flows through the town of Estella-Lizarra.

See also 
 List of rivers of Spain

Rivers of Spain
Rivers of Navarre
Ebro basin
Rivers of Álava
Rivers of the Basque Country (autonomous community)